Brandon Michael Williams (born February 24, 1984) is a former American football wide receiver who last played for the Pittsburgh Steelers of the National Football League. He was drafted by the San Francisco 49ers in the third round of the 2006 NFL Draft. He played college football at Wisconsin.

Williams also played for the St. Louis Rams.

Early years
Attended Normandy High School played with Laurence Maroney, (RB- New England Patriots)   then transferred to Hazelwood East High School, the same high school as fellow and former NFL players Jamar Fletcher (CB - Detroit Lions), Scott Starks, (CB - Jacksonville Jaguars), Terrell Fletcher (former RB - San Diego Chargers), Bryan Fletcher (TE - Indianapolis Colts) and American sports agent Jason Fletcher of B&F Sports. He was named to All-Midlands team by Super Prep and Prep Football Report. He was a two-time, second-team all-state and three-time, first-team all-conference selection. He caught 97 passes for 2,157 yards and returned 58 punts for 1,210 yards and 23 total touchdowns during his career.

College career
As a freshman in 2002, Williams played in all 14 games, including six starts. He was second-team freshman All-American by The Sporting News. He was a first-team freshman All-Big Ten selection by The Sporting News. He had a team-high 52 receptions which was a  school freshman record. He broke the school-record with 32 kickoff returns for a school-record 670 yards. 

Williams started 12 games as sophomore in 2003. He was the team’s No. 2 receiver with 49 catches and one touchdown. He led Badgers with 1,319 all-purpose yards. He ranked seventh in Big Ten with a 21.6-yard kickoff return average. 

In 2004, Williams led the Badgers with 42 receptions and 517 receiving yards. He was second on the team with 1,010 all-purpose yards. He was an honorable mention All-Big Ten pick. 

Williams was named a second-team All-Big Ten selection as a senior in 2005, hauling in 59 passes for 1,095 yards (18.6 avg.) and six touchdowns. He also rushed seven times for 47 yards (6.71 avg.). He ran back 26 punts, taking in two for touchdowns.

External links
Pittsburgh Steelers bio
San Francisco 49ers bio
St. Louis Rams bio

1984 births
Living people
Players of American football from St. Louis
American football return specialists
American football wide receivers
Wisconsin Badgers football players
San Francisco 49ers players
St. Louis Rams players
Pittsburgh Steelers players